Clube Desportivo Nacional, commonly known as Nacional and sometimes Nacional da Madeira, is a Portuguese football club based in Funchal, on the island of Madeira.

Founded on 8 December 1910, it currently plays in the Liga Portugal 2, Portugal's second-tier division of professional football. It plays its home games at Estádio da Madeira, also known as Estádio da Choupana. Built in 1998 and named at the time Estádio Eng. Rui Alves after the current club president Rui Alves, it seats approximately 5,132 people. The stadium is located in the north of Funchal, high in the mountains of the Choupana district

The club's home colours are black and white striped shirts with black shorts and socks. Nacional is also known for being one of the clubs that formed Portuguese international Cristiano Ronaldo and to honour the club's most famous player they named their youth training facilities Cristiano Ronaldo Câmpus Futebol.

The Alvinegros best top-tier league finish was fourth in the 2003–04 Primeira Liga season and their best participation in European competitions was in the 2009–10 UEFA Europa League after beating Zenit St. Petersburg in the play-off round and managing to secure a third place in the group stage.

Like many other Portuguese clubs, Nacional operates several sports teams outside the football team. Other sports groups within the organisation include beach soccer, boxing, artistic gymnastics, rhythmic gymnastics, tennis, triathlon, muay thai, padel, rallying, swimming and veterans' soccer.

History
Nacional reached the first division for the first time ever in the mid-1980s, returning again in 2002–03. The following season was arguably the best ever season, as the side finished fourth in the league, just squeaking past Braga. In that season, three of its key players were Paulo Assunção, a defensive midfielder, and goal-machine Adriano, who netted 19 times. Both would later go to Porto, while the third key player, winger Miguelito, joined Benfica in 2006.

Nacional also had a quarter-final run in the domestic cup, and would lose in the first round of the subsequent 2004–05 UEFA Cup, being defeated twice by Sevilla. In 2006–07's edition, more of the same occurred with two early losses to Rapid București.

In the 2008–09 season, Nacional again edged Braga for the final fourth spot, mainly courtesy of Nenê, who scored 20 goals and won the Golden Boot honor. The side also reached the last-four in the Portuguese Cup, losing on aggregate 5–4 to Paços de Ferreira, with the decider coming at the Estádio da Madeira in the 90th minute.

2009–10 started without Nenê, who was sold to Cagliari for a club-record fee of €4.5 million. In August 2009, however, the club managed to defeat former UEFA Super Cup winners Zenit Saint Petersburg in the UEFA Europa League last round prior to the group stages; after a 4–3 home win, youngster Rúben Micael scored another last-minute goal, as the club was trailing 1–0 in Russia. In the next round, Nacional was drawn alongside Athletic Bilbao, Austria Wien, and Werder Bremen; the Austrians were beaten 5–1 in Madeira, but the Portuguese did not progress to the knockout rounds.

In the 2014–15 season, Nacional had a slow start, being eliminated of 2014–15 UEFA Europa League in the play-off round against Dinamo Minsk, after losing two times in a 2–0 away loss and a 2–3 home loss. But after that the club accomplished a major achievement, after beating rivals Marítimo in a 3–0 home win for the 2014–15 Primeira Liga the Alvinegros managed to beat them again, this time in a 1–1 away draw for the quarter-finals of the 2014–15 Taça de Portugal where Nacional eventually won 6–5 at penalties, granting the team the qualification for the semi-finals of the competition.

On 30 December 2016, Predrag Jokanović began his fourth spell as manager for the club.

On 16 May 2021, Nacional got relegated for 3rd time in the last 5 seasons and becoming into a yo-yo club.

Club presidents 
 António Ascensão Figueira (1910–1926)
 Ernesto Pelágio dos Santos (1926–1932)
 António Caldeira (1932–1936)
 Dr. Consuelo Figueira (1936–1940)
 Luís Lopes Serrão (1940–1944) 
 Dr. Daniel Brazão Machado (1944–1948)
 Dr. José Telentino Costa César Abreu (1954–1958) 
 Dr. António Manuel Sales Caldeira (1958–1964)
 Fernando Pereira Rebelo (1964–1965)
 Luís Lopes Serrão (1966–1969)
 Antonio Manuel Sales Caldeira (1969–1973) 
 Nélio Jorge Ferraz Mendonça (1973–1993)
 Dr. Fausto Pereira (1993–1994)
 Eng. Rui António Macedo Alves (1994–2014)
 João Gris Teixeira (2014–2015) 
 Eng. Rui António Macedo Alves (2015–Present)

Stadium

The Estádio da Madeira, better known as the Choupana, houses Nacional. The current stadium is located around nearby training pitches. The club also built an academy campus in name of its most famous player, Manchester United's Cristiano Ronaldo. The stadium was renovated in 2007 for a new stand and also increasing the capacity to over 5,000 spectators. The total price of the renovations was €20 million.

In these new facilities, no stands were put behind the goals, with a tall fence used in its place. In mid-2007, the stadium name was changed to Estádio da Madeira, because of the excellent sports facilities.

Rivalry

Nacional has a big rivalry with Madeira-neighbours Marítimo. Historically, Marítimo dominated Nacional in the early years, being the first to reach European competition.

Honours

National competitions
Segunda Liga
Winners: 2017–18

Segunda Divisão B / South Zone
Winners: 1999–2000

Regional competitions
AF Madeira Championship
Winners (8): 1934–35, 1936–37, 1938–39, 1941–42, 1942–43, 1943–44, 1968–69, 1974–75

AF Madeira Cup
Winners (6): 1943–44, 1944–45, 1973–74, 1974–75, 2001–02, 2007–08

Other
Ramón de Carranza Trophy
Winners: 2012

League and cup history

European record

Last updated: 28 August 2014
Q = Qualifying; PO = Play-off

Players

Current squad

Former coaches

 Jair Picerni (1989–91)
 Eurico Gomes (1991–92)
 José Rachão (1993–95)
 Rodolfo Reis (1995–96)
 Jair Picerni (1996–98)
 José Alberto Torres (1998–99)
 José Peseiro (1999–03)
 Casemiro Mior (2003–05)
 João Carlos Pereira (2005)
 Manuel Machado (2005–06)
 Carlos Brito (2006–07)
 Predrag Jokanović (2007–08)
 Manuel Machado (2008–10)
 Predrag Jokanović (interim) (2009–10)
 Predrag Jokanović (2010–11)
 Ivo Vieira (2011)
 Pedro Caixinha (2011–12)
 Manuel Machado (2012–2016)
 Predrag Jokanović (2016–2017)
 Costinha (2017–2019)
 Luís Freire (2019–2021)
 Manuel Machado (2021–present)

President

 António Figueira (1910–26)
 Ernesto dos Santos (1926–32)
 António Caldeira (1932–36)
 Consuelo Figueira (1936–40)
 Luís Serrão (1940–44)
 Daniel Machado (1944–48)
 José Abreu (1954–58)
 António Manuel Caldeira (1958–64)
 Fernando Rebelo (1964–65)
 Luís Serrão (1965–69)
 António Manuel Caldeira (1969–73)
 Nélio Mendonça (1973–93)
 Fausto Pereira (1993–94)
 Rui Alves (1994–14)
 João Teixeira (2014–15)
 Rui Alves (2015–)

Player records

Most appearances
Competitive matches only, includes appearances as used substitute.

Most goals
Competitive matches only, includes goals as used substitute.

References

External links

 Official website 

 
Football clubs in Portugal
Sport in Madeira
Association football clubs established in 1910
1910 establishments in Portugal
Primeira Liga clubs
Liga Portugal 2 clubs